A Wizard's Tale (also known as Ahí Viene Cascarrabias in Mexico and Here Comes the Grump internationally) is a 2018 computer-animated adventure comedy film based on the DePatie–Freleng animated series, Here Comes the Grump, which originally ran from 1969 to 1970 on NBC.

Produced by Ánima Estudios, Prime Focus World, and GFM Animation, the film features the voices of Toby Kebbell, Lily Collins, and Ian McShane. The Spanish version stars the voices of Camila Sodi and Mauricio Barrientos "El Diablito".

It was first released in Italy on 1 March 2018. The film was later released on July 26 in Mexico and was a commercial failure.

The film was released by Blue Fox Entertainment in the United States in limited format and VOD on 14 September the same year, released as A Wizard's Tale.

Plot
In an alternate dimension, there exists a kingdom called Groovingham, where a young wizard called The Grin lives. The Grin casts a spell to make people happy, but the magic deprives the subjects of their morality, resulting in instant pandemonium. Outraged, the king orders his royals guards to arrest The Grin. Though the authorities corner him on a cliff, The Grin escapes with his fiancée, Mary, in his blimp-like vehicle.

The Grin goes into hiding and adopts a baby dragon he named Dingo. Mary promises to return to The Grin, but the authorities capture her, and the king has her banished to Earth. Unaware that Mary was exiled, the Grin becomes an embittered pariah called the Grump.

On Earth, Mary owns an amusement park that resembles Groovingham and has a grandson named Terry Dexter. During Terry's youth, his grandmother reads him her bestselling story called "Here Comes the Grump", which summarizes the events before her banishment. Years later, Mary passes away, and Terry became the new owner of her amusement park.

One night Terry finds a hidden piece of his grandmother's blimp. After reattaching the handle to the blimp, it sends him to Groovingham, much to his astonishment. Meanwhile, the Grump, who was captured at some point for his purported crime, escapes from prison alongside his diminutive henchmen called the Grumpies and enacts vengeance upon the king. However, he instantly realizes the king had died after spotting a statue built in his memorial. While feeling cheated out of revenge, the Grin discovers a poster of Princess Dawn's coronation and takes action against her instead. Interrupting the coronation, the Grump casts his "gloom spell" upon everyone, putting them into a state of depression. Princess Dawn manages to escape the gloom by being hidden in a chamber beneath her bed by her servants while her pet, Bip, leaves Groovingham to seek help from an outsider.

As Terry tries to pilot the blimp back to his homeworld, the handle piece is taken by Bip, prompting Terry to chase him into Groovingham. Emerging from hiding, Dawn begs Terry to help save her kingdom. Terry reluctantly agrees so that he can return home. When his minions inform the Grump that Dawn had escaped the gloom, he returns to the castle where Terry recognizes him as the Grin from his grandmother's story. After being chased by the Grumpies through the castle's interior, Terry and Dawn reach the map room where they met a bird named G. P. Sparrow, who agrees to navigate them to the Oracle who knows how to lift the Grin's curse.

Princess Dawn and Terry learn from the Oracle that they need a magical key from the Cave of Whispering Orchards to restore happiness in Groovingham, which the Grump overhears. During the confrontation, the blimp becomes punctured, rendering it unable to be airborne. They seek repairs at the Balloony Kingdom, under siege by the Grump. As Terry and the balloon people fight back, Dawn causes Dingo to sneeze, sending the Grump mounted on him flying away.

With repairs finished on the blimp, the Grump lands on a nearby branch protruding from a cliff and cast the gloom spell on Dawn before plummeting. Seeking help from an alchemist to treat Dawn's condition, Terry learns that a kiss can break the curse afflicted upon her before sunset; otherwise, the spell will be permanent. However, after going through with it, Terry admits that he lacks feelings for Dawn since he has only known her for a day and that he wants to return home, upsetting the princess who dismisses him.

At the Cave of Whispering Orchards the Orchards expel Terry since they only allow wizards inside. The Grump arrives and cast a sleep spell on Terry before proceeding to get the key. Bip returns to Dawn, who returns to Terry and awakens him with a kiss. The Grump returns empty-handed and accuses Terry of taking the key. Terry denies the claims, but a key falls off him. He and Dawn try to escape but lose consciousness after falling into a pit.

While incarcerated in Groovingham, Dawn asks Terry how he obtained the key. He hypothesizes that he is a wizard himself. After Bip frees them, Dawn and Terry confront the Grump on the castle's rooftop, using the key to eliminate happiness. Dawn manages to subdue the Grumpies while Terry subdues the Grump but also damages the key. Dawn implores Terry to leave on the blimp, but he decides to stay with her. Through their faith, they restore the key, which undoes the Grump's magic on Groovingham. The Grump retreats to his blimp and fights with Terry while heading to Earth. Upon visiting Mary's amusement park, the Grump becomes remorseful since he only wanted to make people happy. Terry convinces him that they still can and reveals himself as his grandson.

Terry reopens Groovingland, where he introduces Dawn to his parents and employs the Grump and the other characters from Groovingham as attractions.

Voice cast
 Toby Kebbell as Terry Dexter
 Lily Collins / Camila Sodi (Spanish) as Princess Dawn
 Ian McShane as The Grump
 Keith Wickham / Mauricio Barrientos (Spanish) as GP Sparrow
 David Holt as Bip
 Emma Tate as Grandma Mary/Nanny Bear
 Amy Thompson as Mary / Old Woman / Whispering Orchids
 Jay Britton as Grumpies / Caveman / Thelonious
 Andres Williams as Chancellor Woodblock
 Claire Morgan as Fasion Manager
 Paul Tylak as Oracle / Balloon Herald 2 / Red Bird 
 Darren Altman as Robert
 Inel Tomlinson as Prime Pine / Air Doll / Generic Balloon 1
 Ed Gaughan as Omette / Christmas Tree 3 / Hobo
 John Hasler as Amusement Park Dad / Beefeater 3
 Rasmus Hardiker as Balloon Herald 1 / Prince Charming
 Matthew Bloxham as Christmas Tree 2 / Generic Balloon 3
 Fred Grey as Royal Guard 2 / Singing Map / Taxman / Additional Crowd
 Alexander Cobb as Toby's Dad / Yellow Wizard / Additional Crowd
 Alana Ramsey as Additional Crowd
 Sophie Alfred as Additional Crowd

Development
The film was first announced in September 2014 when a film adaptation of the Here Comes the Grump cartoon, produced by Ánima Estudios, was in development. Development didn't start immediately after its announcement due to development of other projects.

Production of the film was completed in 2017.

While the original series was only moderately successful in the United States, the show has gained popularity in Mexico.

Character designs
The film's characters were designed by Craig Kellman, who has also designed characters for other animated films, such as Hotel Transylvania and Madagascar.

Animation
The film's animation was created at Prime Focus World at its London and Mumbai facilities. Greg Gavanski, head of Prime Focus Animation, said: "Animation is well underway and our artists are pushing the limits to put as much quality and humor into every last frame".

Mexican animation studio Ánima Estudios was in charge of the film's creative development and supervision, with the direction done by Andrés Couturier, the manager at Ánima.

Casting
British actors Toby Kebbell, Lily Collins, and Ian McShane joined the film's lead English voice cast, with the casting done by Todd Resnick's The Voice Company studio in Los Angeles.

Prime Focus's Greg Gavanski commented that he was "thrilled" with the casting: "We are thrilled to welcome Ian, Lily and Toby to the Grump team. This hugely talented voice cast, alongside the beautiful animation delivered by the artists of Ánima [Estudios] and Prime Focus, has brought these fantastic characters to life in ways we couldn't have imagined. I couldn't have hoped for things to come together any better than this".

The casting has also marked a history for Ánima Estudios, to which producer and company COO José C. García de Letona has shared his excitement: "Having such amazing actors be part of our movie makes us feel even more excited about it. We are sure that the audiences will love McShane's grouchy character, Lily's adorable princess and Toby's cool hero".

Music
James Seymour Brett has composed the film's original score.

Release
The film was released in the United States in limited locations and digital platforms on 14 September 2018.

Box office
In Mexico, the film performed weakly at the box-office, opening at #6 and grossing $8.99 million pesos (est. $0.48 million USD). In its second week, the film moved down to #8, grossing $4.26 million pesos (est. US$0.2 million) which brings a total of $18.44 million pesos (est. US$0.99 million). It has earned $22.9 million pesos in total.

In the United States, the film has grossed $1,626 in 10 theaters.

The film has grossed a total of $4.55 million worldwide.

Awards and nominations

See also
 Here Comes the Grump
 Ánima Estudios
 DePatie–Freleng Enterprises

References

External links
 GFM Films profile
 
 

2018 computer-animated films
2010s fantasy comedy films
2010s adventure comedy films
2010s children's comedy films
Ánima Estudios films
2010s children's adventure films
2010s children's fantasy films
Mexican animated films
Mexican children's films
2010s Spanish-language films
Films based on television series
British 3D films
British computer-animated films
British animated fantasy films
British children's animated films
British children's comedy films
British children's fantasy films
Films set in London
Animated films based on animated series
2018 comedy films
2010s English-language films
2010s British films
2010s Mexican films